Björn Daniel Arne Yttling (born 16 October 1974 in Umeå, Sweden) is a Swedish music producer, songwriter, and musician. His production and songwriting credits include Lykke Li, Chrissie Hynde, Primal Scream, Franz Ferdinand, Sahara Hotnights, Anna Ternheim. Yttling is the bassist of the indie rock trio Peter Bjorn and John. He is also a co-founder of the label and artist collective INGRID and a member of the band LIV.

Biography

Early life
Yttling was raised in Norsjö and started to create and record music at the age of eight. He moved to Västerås to attend a high school with a music programme. At high school, he met Peter Morén.

Works and production
Yttling has a jazz band called Yttling Jazz, which released the album Oh Lord, Why Can't I Keep My Big Mouth Shut in 2007.

Yttling has produced the Peter Bjorn and John albums as well as several other albums, e.g. Sparks and What If Leaving Is a Loving Thing by Sahara Hotnights, Our Ill Wills by Shout Out Louds, Open Field by Taken by Trees, Youth Novels and I Never Learn by Lykke Li, Right Thoughts, Right Words, Right Action by Franz Ferdinand and Beautiful Future by Primal Scream.

Yttling is Chrissie Hynde's chief collaborator on her 2014 release, Stockholm, on which he plays electric bass, celeste, acoustic guitar, electric guitar, mellotron, organ, percussion, piano, and synthesizer. Yttling and Hynde co-wrote all but two of the songs on this album and he is the album's producer.

Discography

References

Swedish male musicians
1974 births
Living people
Peter Bjorn and John members
People from Umeå Municipality